Nwafor Orizu College of Education is located in Anambra state,  Nigeria was founded in 1976. It is  formerly known as a College of Education Nsugbe. It was named after the Second Senate President of Nigeria, Abyssinia Akweke Nwafor Orizu.

On July 12, 2018, a bill was sponsored by Dr Tony Nwoye for the upgrade of the college of education to Federal University of Education.

The current Vice Chancellor of Nwafor Orizu College of Education is ..,

Courses offered by Nwafor Orizu  College of Education 

Agricultural science

Biology/ Chemistry

Biology/ Geography

Biology/ Integrated science

Biology/ Mathematics

Business Education

Chemistry/Integrated Science

Chemistry/ Mathematics

Chemistry/ Physics

Christian Religious Studies/ Economics

Christian Religious Studies/ English

Christian Religious Studies/ French

Christian Religious Studies/ Geography

Christian Religious Studies/ History

Christian Religious Studies/ Igbo

Christian Religious Studies/ Social Studies

Computer Education / Geography

Computer Education / Physics

Computer Education / Biology

Computer Education / Chemistry

Computer Education / Economics

Computer Science Education / Integrated Science

Computer Science Education / Mathematics

Early Childhood Care Education

Economics / English

Economics / Geography

Economics / History

Economics / Mathematics

Economics / Physics

Economics / Political Science

Economics / Social Studies

English / French

English / Geography

English / History

English / Igbo

English / Political Science

English / Social Studies

English / Yoruba

Fine And Applied Art

French / Social Studies

French / Ibibio

French / Igbo

French / Mathematics

French / Yoruba

Geography / French

Geography / Integrated Science

Geography / Mathematics

Geography / Physics

Geography / Social Studies

Igbo / Yoruba

Integrated Science / Mathematics Education

Integrated Science / Physics

Mathematics / Physics

Mathematics / Social Studies

Physical and Health Education

Music

Physical and Health Education

Political Science / Mathematics

Primary Education Studies

Yoruba / Social Studies

References 

Universities and colleges in Nigeria
1976 establishments in Nigeria
Education in Anambra State